Luo Wei (simplified Chinese: 罗苇; born in 1989) is a Chinese visual artist working in performance, photography, painting, theatre, audio and installation art. She often combines media to produce her art and bases it on science and biology. Luo's methods in her creative practice also include working collaboratively and a focus on academic research. She is often the subject of her own art.

Biography 
Luo Wei was born in Guangzhou, China, in 1989. She graduated from Guangzhou Academy of Fine Art High School in 2008, and received a BFA degree in oil-painting from the China Central Academy of Fine Arts in 2012. Luo now lives and works in Beijing.

Artworks 
Luo's art is based on observing and intervening in the world and juxtaposes subjectivity and objectivity. In oil painting to installation art, she takes inspiration from traditional Chinese ink painting.

CP - Crystal Planet 
Crystal Planet is the field created by microscopic (2014-). In its online form, she shares it with people from all over the world. The project developed with a team and involved the interaction with viewers by inviting the audience to participate or encouraging the netizens to structure parts of the planet in order to form a pluralistic world for people to visit, browse and renovate.

The first Crystal Planet Carnival was opened at Amy Lee Gallery.

Select solo exhibitions 

 2015 Crystal Planet, Amy Li Gallery, Beijing, China
 2014 What we talk about when we talk about ARTIST, Amy Li Gallery, Beijing, China
 2012 Spectator, Germany

References 

1989 births
Living people
21st-century Chinese women artists
21st-century Chinese artists
Chinese contemporary artists